The 1943 Arkansas Razorbacks football team represented the University of Arkansas in the Southwest Conference (SWC) during the 1943 college football season. In their first and only year under head coach John Tomlin, the Razorbacks compiled a 2–7 record (1–4 against SWC opponents), finished in last place in the SWC, and were outscored by their opponents by a combined total of 192 to 105.

Receiver Ben Jones tied for fifth in the nation in receptions in 1943. Punter Harold Cox led the nation in yards per punt average, with 41.0.

Schedule

References

Arkansas
Arkansas Razorbacks football seasons
Arkansas Razorbacks football